Kelli Renee Williams (born June 8, 1970) is an American actress and director. She is known for her roles as lawyer, Lindsay Dole on the legal drama The Practice, psychologist and deception expert Dr. Gillian Foster on Lie to Me, and Jackie Clarke on Army Wives.

Early life
Kelli Williams was born in Los Angeles, California. She is the daughter of actress Shannon Wilcox and plastic surgeon John Williams. Her parents divorced when she was 13. She has one brother and two half-brothers.

Williams earned her Screen Actors Guild card before her first birthday by appearing in a diapers commercial, and appeared in several other commercials as a child. She attended elementary school at Lycée Français, and graduated from Beverly Hills High School in 1988. While attending school, she was active in the performing arts department. After starring opposite  Steve Burton (who would go on to gain fame on General Hospital) in the school's production of Romeo and Juliet, she was signed by an agent.

Career
Williams began her career on television in 1989, with a role in an episode of the CBS series Beauty and the Beast and as the first victim of the Hillside Stranglers in NBC's made-for-TV film The Case of the Hillside Stranglers.

Her first feature film appearances were in Zapped Again! (1990) and There Goes My Baby (1994) opposite ER's Noah Wyle. She also appeared in The Young Riders in 1991. Also in 1994, she played Jennifer Stolpa in the TV movie Snowbound: The Jim and Jennifer Stolpa Story. She guest starred on the Fox teen drama Party of Five in its first season in 1994 as Annie Alcott. She  guest-starred in the 1992 Law & Order episode "Sisters Of Mercy" as a meth addict who accuses a nun of sexually abusing her.

Beginning with episode 11, "Moon Cross" (aired on February 5, 1995), of the science-fiction series Earth 2, Williams appeared in a multiple episode story arc in the role of Mary, a human orphan raised on another planet by the indigenous alien species known as the Terrians.

In 1997, she took her most prominent role as Lindsay Dole Donnell on the ABC legal drama The Practice. She appeared in the series The Lyon's Den and Hack, as well as two episodes of Scrubs. Williams appeared as Dr. Natalie Durant on the NBC television show Medical Investigation which began in the fall of 2004 and ran for 20 episodes before being canceled. Also in 2004, she starred in the TV movie A Boyfriend for Christmas.

In 2000, Williams starred in the TV movie Flowers for Algernon, based on the novel/short story by Daniel Keyes.

In May 2007, she portrayed Holly Lauren/Kathleen Shaw in the Law & Order: Criminal Intent sixth-season finale episode, "Renewal," as a friendly neighbor of Detective Mike Logan (Chris Noth); her character died toward the end of the episode. In August 2008, Williams was cast in a lead role as psychologist Dr. Gillian Foster in the Fox series Lie to Me, opposite Tim Roth as Dr. Cal Lightman, which ran for three seasons and ended in 2011.

In April 2011, she was cast in a guest role as Shelley Chamberlain, a grieving mother on a killing spree in the CBS series Criminal Minds. In October 2011, she was cast in a guest role as a kidnapped child's mother called Elizabeth Flint in the CBS series The Mentalist. In 2012, she landed the recurring role of Jackie Clarke in the Lifetime series Army Wives and was quickly promoted to a series regular.

On August 12, 2015, Ties That Bind, the first original series from the Up Network, debuted with Williams playing police detective Allison McLean. The series balances McLean's work and family.

In 2020, she joined the cast of the new Paramount network series, Coyote, starring Michael Chiklis.

Personal life 
Williams was married to author Ajay Sahgal from 1996 to 2017. She converted to Hinduism after marrying her husband. The couple has three children. She told Marie Claire that she got breast implants when she was 19 and had them removed when she was 22. Williams speaks French and Spanish, and has volunteered with the Young Storytellers Program.

Filmography

Director

Film

Television

References

External links 
 
 Kelli Williams at LieToMe.com

1970 births
Living people
20th-century American actresses
21st-century American actresses
Actresses from Los Angeles
American film actresses
American television actresses
Beverly Hills High School alumni
Lycée Français de Los Angeles alumni
Converts to Hinduism